WIS (acronym)  may stand for:

Radio and television
 WIS (TV), a television station (channel 10) licensed to serve Columbia, South Carolina
 WVOC, a radio station in Columbia, South Carolina which held the call sign WIS from 1930–86

Schools
 Walsh Intermediate School, a middle school in Branford, Connecticut
 Washington International School, in the District of Columbia
 Weizmann Institute of Science, in Rehovot, Israel
 West Island School, a British high school in Hong Kong, China
 Windhoek International School, in Windhoek, Namibia

Other
 Outer Hebrides (Western Isles), Scotland, Chapman code WIS
 Wisconsin, a U.S. state
 Web information system
 wisit, web-based integrating systems information technology
 Wedge imaging spectrometer, a type of imaging spectrometer
 WiS, the original name of the Vis pistol
 Book of Wisdom, one of the deuterocanonical books of the Bible